Küpfmüller's uncertainty principle by Karl Küpfmüller in the year 1924 states that the relation of the rise time of a bandlimited signal to its bandwidth is a constant.

with  either  or

Proof

as (applying the convolution theorem)

Since the fourier transform of a rectangular function is a sinc function and vice versa, follows

Regarding that a real signal has both positive and negative frequencies of the same frequency band,  becomes ,
which leads to  instead of

See also
 Heisenberg's uncertainty principle

References

Further reading
 
 
 

Electronic engineering
1924 in science
´